Asterope (minor planet designation: 233 Asterope) is a large main-belt asteroid that was discovered on 11 May 1883, by French astronomer Alphonse Borrelly at Marseille Observatory in Marseille, France. The asteroid was named after Asterope (or Sterope), one of the Pleiades.

The orbital plane is inclined by 7.68° to the plane of the ecliptic. It is a rare T-type asteroid and has a relatively dark surface. The spectrum of 233 Asterope bears a resemblance to Troilite, a sulfurous iron mineral found in most iron meteorites.

Photometric observations during 1995 show a rotation period of
19.743 hours. Measurements made with the IRAS observatory give a diameter of 109.56 ± 5.04 km and a geometric albedo of 0.08 ± 0.01. By comparison, the MIPS photometer on the Spitzer Space Telescope gives a diameter of 97.54 ± 10.32 km and a geometric albedo of 0.10 ± 0.01.

References

External links 
 The Asteroid Orbital Elements Database
 Minor Planet Discovery Circumstances
 Asteroid Lightcurve Data File
 
 

Background asteroids
Asterope
Asterope
T-type asteroids (Tholen)
K-type asteroids (SMASS)
18830511